Fraternity row or Fraternity Row may refer to:

 An area with a concentration of fraternities and sororities, frequently found in college towns:
 Piedmont Avenue (Berkeley)

Also:

 Fraternity Row (Film)
 Fraternity Row, a "soap within a soap" on ABC's One Life to Live